M. J. Appaji Gowda (20 June 1951 - 2 September 2020) was a Janata Dal (Secular) political activist and member of the Karnataka Legislative Council.
 He died on 2 September 2020, after testing positive for COVID-19 during the COVID-19 pandemic in India.

References

External links 
 N. Appaji Gowda affidavit

1951 births
2020 deaths
Members of the Karnataka Legislative Council
Janata Dal (Secular) politicians
People from Shimoga district
Deaths from the COVID-19 pandemic in India